Albert Sulikovich Tsarayev (born 13 December 1967) is a Russian professional football coach and a former player.

Personal life
His son Alan Tsarayev is also a football player.

External links
 

1967 births
Sportspeople from Vladikavkaz
Living people
Soviet footballers
Russian footballers
Association football midfielders
Pakhtakor Tashkent FK players
FC Dynamo Stavropol players
FK Neftchi Farg'ona players
FC Kuban Krasnodar players
BFC Siófok players
FC Volgar Astrakhan players
FC KAMAZ Naberezhnye Chelny players
Russian Premier League players
Russian expatriate footballers
Expatriate footballers in Uzbekistan
Expatriate footballers in Hungary
Russian expatriate sportspeople in Uzbekistan
Russian expatriate sportspeople in Hungary
Russian football managers
FC Spartak-UGP Anapa players